Minon: Everyday Hero, known in Japan as  and in North America as Domino Rally, is a video game developed by Red Entertainment for Nintendo's Wii console. Its gameplay is similar to the 1998 game No One Can Stop Mr. Domino!.

The game was first listed by Mastiff at the 2006 Electronic Entertainment Expo under the title Mr. D Goes to Town. It was later shown developer Red Entertainment and publisher Success at a Nintendo Wii press event in Tokyo during September 2006. Titled Machi Kuru Domino, they planned to release it as a launch game for the console.

Reception

Minon: Everyday Hero received mixed reviews from critics. On Metacritic, the game has a score of 57/100 based on 4 reviews, indicating "mixed or average reviews".

Sean Aaron of Nintendo Life gave the game 6 stars out of 10, praising the controls and soundtrack but criticizing the low amount of content it had to offer, resulting in the game lacking longevity.

References

External links
 
Review at Silconera.com

2007 video games
Action video games
Red Entertainment games
Wii-only games
Wii games
Multiplayer and single-player video games
Success (company) games
Video games developed in Japan
UFO Interactive Games games
Nordcurrent games